is a former professional basketball player and the head coach of the Shinshu Brave Warriors in the Japanese B.League.

Early life
Katsuhisa was born in Tokyo to a Japanese father and American mother. He attended Nishimachi International School  in Tokyo, where his father was the headmaster, then Bellevue High School in Washington, United States.

Professional career

As a player
Katsuhisa was drafted fifth overall by the Osaka Evessa in the 2009 bj league draft. At the end of his first season he was released as a player and signed as a coach of the Evessa's reserve team. However, injuries to Evessa's main players saw he re-signed as a player in January 2011.

As a coach
In the 2011 off-season he left the Evessa to become an assistant coach at the expansion team Yokohama B-Corsairs under former NBA player Reggie Geary. Katsuhisa was Geary's assistant and interpreter for two seasons, including during their championship 2012-13 season. At the end of the 2012-13 season Geary left the B-Corsairs and Katsuhisa became head coach. However, the team lost most of its championship stars and struggled under Katsuhisa. In his first season as head coach the B-Corsairs finished with a 24-28 record, missing out on the playoffs for the first time in the club's history.

Katsuhisa remained as head coach for the 2014-15 season. The club struggled further however, with star Wayne Marshall missing a quarter of the season due to injury. They finished the season in 10th place in the Eastern Conference with an 18-34 win–loss record.

In June 2015 Katsuhisa was named as the coach of the Shimane Susanoo Magic for the 2015-16 season. He was replaced at the B-Corsairs by his assistant, Taketo Aoki.

Head coaching record

|- 
| style="text-align:left;"|Yokohama B-Corsairs
| style="text-align:left;"|2013-14
| 52||24||28|||| style="text-align:center;"|7th in Eastern|||-||-||-||
| style="text-align:center;"|Missed playoffs
|-
| style="text-align:left;"|Yokohama B-Corsairs
| style="text-align:left;"|2014-15
|52||18||34|||| style="text-align:center;"|10th in Eastern|||-||-||-||
| style="text-align:center;"|Missed playoffs
|-
| style="text-align:left;"|Shimane Susanoo Magic
| style="text-align:left;"|2015-16
| 52||37||15|||| style="text-align:center;"|3rd in Western|||2||0||2||
| style="text-align:center;"|Lost in first round
|-
| style="text-align:left;"|Shimane Susanoo Magic
| style="text-align:left;"|2016-17
| 60||51||9|||| style="text-align:center;"|1st in B2 Western|||4||2||2||
| style="text-align:center;"|Runners-up in B2
|-
|- style="background:#FDE910;"
| style="text-align:left;"|Shinshu Brave Warriors
| style="text-align:left;"|2018-19
| 60||48||12|||| style="text-align:center;"|1st in B2 Central|||4||4||0||
| style="text-align:center;"|B2 Champion
|-
|- 
| style="text-align:left;"|Shinshu Brave Warriors
| style="text-align:left;"|2019-20
| 47||40||7|||| style="text-align:center;"|1st in B2 Central|||-||-||-||
| style="text-align:center;"|-
|-

Personal life
Katsuhisa's older brother Geoffrey Katsuhisa works as an interpreter and has been the interpreter for the coaches of several clubs in Japan's professional basketball leagues. In June 2015 Geoffrey himself became the head coach of the Iwate Big Bulls.

References

1983 births
Living people
Japanese basketball coaches
Utsunomiya Brex coaches
Osaka Evessa players
Senshu University alumni
Shimane Susanoo Magic coaches
Shinshu Brave Warriors coaches
Yokohama B-Corsairs coaches